Soltanabad (also Romanized as Solţānābād) is a village in Zangiabad Rural District, in the Central District of Kerman County, Kerman Province, Iran. At the 2006 census, its population was 33, in 5 families.

References 

Populated places in Kerman County